Grevillea lissopleura is a species of flowering plant in the family Proteaceae and is endemic to a relatively small area of inland Western Australia. It is an erect shrub with linear leaves and clusters of white to cream-coloured flowers.

Description

Taxonomy
Grevillea lissopleura was first formally described in 1986 by Donald McGillivray in his book, New Names in Grevillea (Proteaceae) from specimens collected in 1979. The specific epithet, (lissopleura), means "smooth rib", referring to the leaf veins.

Distribution and habitat
This grevillea grows on rocky ridges in shrubland between Southern Cross and Mount Holland in the Avon Wheatbelt, Coolgardie and Mallee bioregions of inland Western Australia.

Conservation status
Grevillea lissopleura is listed as "Priority One" by the Government of Western Australia Department of Biodiversity, Conservation and Attractions, meaning that it is known from only one or a few locations which are potentially at risk.

See also
 List of Grevillea species

References

lissopleura
Proteales of Australia
Flora of Western Australia
Taxa named by Donald McGillivray
Plants described in 1986